T-cell surface glycoprotein CD3 zeta chain also known as T-cell receptor T3 zeta chain or CD247 (Cluster of Differentiation 247) is a protein that in humans is encoded by the CD247 gene.

Some older literature mention a similar protein called "CD3 eta" in mice. It is now understood to be an isoform differing in the last exon.

Genomics 

The gene is located on the long arm of chromosome 1  at location 1q22-q25 on the Crick (negative) strand. The encoded protein is 164 amino acids long with a predicted weight of 18.696 kiloDaltons.

Function 

T-cell receptor zeta (ζ), together with T-cell receptor alpha/beta and gamma/delta heterodimers and CD3-gamma, -delta, and -epsilon, forms the T-cell receptor-CD3 complex. The zeta chain plays an important role in coupling antigen recognition to several intracellular signal-transduction pathways. Low expression of the antigen results in impaired immune response. Two alternatively spliced transcript variants encoding distinct isoforms have been found for this gene.

Interactions 

CD247 has been shown to interact with Janus kinase 3 and Protein unc-119 homolog.

See also 
 Cluster of differentiation
 ZAP70

References

Further reading

External links 
 
 
 

Clusters of differentiation